Arvo Kuddo (born on 20 November 1954 in Tartu) is an Estonian economist and politician.

1990–1991, he was Minister of Social Care, and 1991–1992 he was Minister of Labor.

References

Living people
1954 births
20th-century Estonian economists
Recipients of the Order of the National Coat of Arms, 3rd Class
Recipients of the Order of the National Coat of Arms, 4th Class
Labour ministers of Estonia
Moscow State University alumni
Politicians from Tartu
21st-century Estonian economists